Young-hwan is a Korean masculine given name. Its meaning differs based on the hanja used to write each syllable of the name. There are 39 hanja with the reading "young" and 21 hanja with the reading "hwan" on the South Korean government's official list of hanja which may be used in given names. It was the ninth-most popular name for newborn boys in South Korea in 1950.

People with this name include:
Min Young-hwan (1861–1905), Korean Empire government official and reformist
Chung Yeong-hwan (born 1938), South Korean football player
Park Young-hwan (born 1942), South Korean football player
Cha Young-hwan (born 1990), South Korean football player

See also
List of Korean given names

References

Korean masculine given names